Ancistrocerus adiabatus is a species of potter wasp.

References

Hymenoptera of North America
Potter wasps
Insects described in 1853
Taxa named by Henri Louis Frédéric de Saussure